Shedding Skin is the third album by British singer, songwriter and musician Ghostpoet. The album was nominated for the 2015 Mercury Music Prize.

Track listing

References

2015 albums
Ghostpoet albums
PIAS Recordings albums